Ognenny Ostrov (literally: Fire Island) is a small lake island in the central Russian Vologda region. It hosts a high security prison ("Correctional colony No. 5 of the Federal Penitentiary Service Administration for the Vologda Region") for formerly condemned and other dangerous inmates called Vologodskiy Pyatak or simply Pyatak (literally: Vologda's fiver). Ognenny Ostrov is located about 400 kilometers north of Moscow, on Lake Novozero.

A Russian Orthodox monastery was founded on this island in 1517 by St. Cyril of Novozero after he witnessed "a column of fire" hitting the island. The monastery buildings were used as a backdrop in the 1973 Vasily Shukshin movie “Red Roses” and in some stories by Russian writer Alexandr Yashin.

Following the October Revolution in 1917, the monastery was converted into a prison to hold “enemies of the revolution”. During the 1930s and 1940s it functioned as a penal colony for victims of the purges of Joseph Stalin. After Stalin's death in 1953, it was turned into a regular prison for non-political dangerous criminals.

In 1997, the prison was converted into a facility housing only prisoners serving life sentences and those formerly sentenced to death; the latter group had their sentences commuted to life following the 1996 moratorium on the death penalty in Russia. The prison, formally known as Prison No. OE 256/5 (ФКУ ИК-5)– and “Pyatak” amongst the inmates (named after the last digit of the formal name) - currently holds approximately 193 prisoners. 

Some experts say the prison is more comfortable and the guards less cruel compared to other Russian prisons housing lifers.

Media
 Three Days and Never Again (Last Visit). Video. 53 min. Director: Alexsandr Goutman, 1998.

References

External links

 "ФКУ ИК-5." Federal Penitentiary Service, Vologda Oblast 
 Sentenced to Life on Fire Island. December 23, 2004. Last accessed August 8, 2006.
 Sentence to Life on Fire Island. Photo Essay. The Moscow Times, December 23, 2004. Last accessed August 8, 2006.
 Google Maps Location. Last accessed August 8, 2006.

 
Islands of Russia
Prisons in Russia
Geography of Vologda Oblast
Prisons in the Soviet Union